Mersin Archaeological Museum is a museum in Mersin, Turkey

Location
It is a two storey building. In addition to exhibit halls there is a library, a conference room, a children's play room and a market in the museum.

History
Mersin Province has many ancient sites. Yumuktepe and Soli in Mersin city and Gözlükule in Tarsus are among these. But prior to the foundation Mersin Museum, the findings were exhibited in other museums. Mersin Museum was founded in 1978. Its former location was in Mersin Halkevi Building. However the exhibition hall of the former museum building was insufficient for the Mersin-area-archaeological items and the new building was constructed.  It was opened on 18 May 2017.

Exhibits
The visitors enter a time tunnel, in which various stages in paleolithic, neolithic, chalcolithic, bronze and iron
ages are displayed in chronological order. Then there are replicas (diorama) of neolithic dwellings, ancient olive presses and a pool of amphoras. In the upper floor,  findings from Yumuktepe, Soli, Elaiussa Sebaste and many other places are exhibited. Some items are exhibited in showcases. There is also a Hellenistic inscription from Bozyazı, i.e., ancient Nagidos and various statues as well as column headings. In ethnography section,  exhibits about later-era-Yörüks (nomadic Turkmens) and the replica of a hug, a primitive dwelling found close to Yumuktepe are exhibited. The total number of exhibits is 1435.

Gallery

References

Archaeological
Yenişehir, Mersin
Archaeological museums in Turkey
2017 establishments in Turkey
Museums established in 2017